The following is a list of notable Nuyorican/Stateside Puerto Rican 
Bia (rapper) (Medford)
 Big Pun (The Bronx)
 Bodega Bamz (New York City)
 Chino XL (The Bronx)
 CJ (rapper) (Staten Island)
 Diamond (rapper) (Atlanta)
 Fat Joe (The Bronx)
 Iann Dior (Corpus Christi)
 Jim Jones (Harlem)
 J.I the Prince of N.Y (Brooklyn)
 Joell Ortiz (Brooklyn)
 Kevin Gates (Baton Rouge)
 K7 (musician) (New York City)
 Kid Buu (rapper) (Miami)
 Lin-Manuel Miranda (New York City)
 Lloyd Banks (South Jamaica)
 Nitty Scott, MC (Brooklyn)
 N.O.R.E. (Queens)
 Prince Markie Dee (Brooklyn)
 Princess Nokia (Harlem)
 Prince Whipper Whip (New York City)
 P-Star (Harlem)
 Residente (New York City)
 Rico Nasty (Palmer Park)
 Siya (Brooklyn)
 Skinnyfromthe9 (Somerville)
 Thirstin Howl III (Brooklyn)
 Tony Sunshine (The Bronx)
 Wifisfuneral (West Palm Beach)
 Wiki (rapper) (New York City)
 Young M.A (Brooklyn)

Puerto Rican rappers
Lists of people from New York City
Puerto Rican culture in New York City